is a female long-distance runner from Japan. She set her personal best in the women's marathon on January 30, 2000 in Osaka, clocking 2:25:14.

Achievements

References

marathoninfo

1971 births
Living people
Japanese female long-distance runners
Japanese female marathon runners
Asian Games bronze medalists for Japan
Asian Games medalists in athletics (track and field)
Athletes (track and field) at the 2006 Asian Games
Medalists at the 2006 Asian Games
Japan Championships in Athletics winners
20th-century Japanese women
21st-century Japanese women